The AVIC AG600 Kunlong is a large amphibious aircraft designed by AVIC and assembled by CAIGA.

Powered by four WJ-6 turboprops, it is one of the largest flying boats with a  MTOW.

After five years of development, assembly started in August 2014, it was rolled out on 23 July 2016 and it made its first flight from Zhuhai Airport on 24 December 2017; it should be certified in 2021, with deliveries starting in 2022.

Development
The AG600 was previously known as the TA-600; it was designated the Dragon 600 before TA-600.
After five years of development, CAIGA started to build the aircraft in August 2014, for a first flight targeted at the time for 2015.
Assembly was still on its way in October 2015. 
The prototype was rolled out on 23 July 2016 at the Zhuhai AVIC factory.
At the roll-out, AVIC targeted a maiden flight by the end of 2016 and it has then gathered 17 orders, all from the Chinese government including the China Coast Guard, AVIC does not expect to produce it in large numbers.
Target markets also include export sales, with island countries such as New Zealand and Malaysia having expressed an interest.

On 24 December 2017, it made its maiden flight from Zhuhai Jinwan Airport.
In May 2018, AVIC planned to have Civil Aviation Administration of China type certification completed by 2021 and deliveries starting in 2022.

After transfer from Zhuhai to Jingmen, the prototype started low-speed taxiing on the Zhanghe reservoir on 30 August 2018. On 20 October 2018, the prototype AG600 completed its first water take-off and landing at Jingmen's Zhanghe Reservoir and on 26 July 2020, the AG600 completed its first test flight from the ocean, after taking off from Qingdao.

An AG600M, being a dedicated firefighting model, successfully completed scooping and dropping water tests in September 2022.  Further variants may be developed for maritime surveillance, resource detection, passenger and cargo transport.
It is one of the three big plane projects approved by the State Council of China, with the Xi'an Y-20 military transport and the Comac C919 airliner.

Design

The AG600 amphibious aircraft has a single body flying boat fuselage, cantilevered high wings, four WJ-6 turboprops and tricycle retractable landing gear.
and should be able to conduct Sea State 3 operations with  waves.

AVIC claims it is the largest amphibious aircraft. It is heavier than the  MTOW Beriev Be-200 or the  ShinMaywa US-2, but lighter than the prototype-only  Beriev A-40. Previous seaplanes were heavier, as the  Martin JRM Mars or the prototypes  Blohm & Voss BV 238,  Saunders-Roe Princess or  Hughes H-4 Hercules.

It could access remote atolls in the South China Sea’s Spratly Islands, claimed by several bordering nations,
as the South China Sea is subjected to territorial disputes.
It can fly in four hours from the southern city of Sanya to James Shoal, the southernmost edge of China's territorial claims.

Specifications (AG600)

See also

References

External links
 

AVIC aircraft
Amphibious aircraft
Aerial firefighting aircraft
High-wing aircraft
Four-engined tractor aircraft
Four-engined turboprop aircraft
2010s Chinese military utility aircraft
2017 in China
Aircraft first flown in 2017
Flying boats